The Premio Verziere is a Group 3 flat horse race in Italy open to thoroughbred fillies and mares aged three years or older. It is run at Milan over a distance of 2,000 metres (about 1¼ miles), and it is scheduled to take place each year in October.

History
The event was formerly classed at Listed level, and it used to be held in May or June. It was promoted to Group 3 status and renamed the Premio Paolo Mezzanotte in 2004. For a period it was open to fillies aged four or older.

The race reverted to its previous title, the Premio Verziere, in 2009. From this point it was staged in October, and open to fillies aged three and up.

The title "Premio Paolo Mezzanotte" is currently assigned to a different race, a Listed event formerly known as the Premio FIA-BEF.

Records
Most successful horse:
 Quaduna – 2013, 2014

Leading jockey since 2002 (3 wins):
 Edmondo Botti – Nashatara (2003), Exhibit One (2006), Wickwing (2007)

Leading trainer since 2002 (2 wins):
 Valfredo Valiani – Vigata (2005), Exhibit One (2006)
 Andreas Wohler- Quaduna (2013, 2014)

Winners since 2002

Earlier winners

 1977: Cima Cresta
 1981: Holga
 1983: Lina Cavalieri
 1987: Kris the Lady
 1988: Sharp Gain
 1990: Free Thinker
 1991: So Romantic
 1994: Ginevra di Camelot
 1995: Foolish Heart
 1996: Rosi Zambotti
 1997: Karla Wyller
 1998: Field of Hope
 1999: Sopran Taireen
 2000: She's So Lovely
 2001: In the Night

See also
 List of Italian flat horse races

References

 Racing Post / www.labronica.it:
 galopp-sieger.de – Premio Paolo Mezzanotte.
 galopp-sieger.de – Premio Verziere.
 horseracingintfed.com – International Federation of Horseracing Authorities – Premio Verziere (2016).
 pedigreequery.com – Premio Verziere – Milano San Siro.

Horse races in Italy
Middle distance horse races for fillies and mares
Sport in Milan